The fleshfish (Dermatopsis macrodon), also known as the Eastern yellow blindfish, is a species of viviparous brotula found in reefs of southern Australia and around New Zealand. This species grows to a length of  TL.

References
 
 
 Tony Ayling & Geoffrey Cox, Collins Guide to the Sea Fishes of New Zealand,  (William Collins Publishers Ltd, Auckland, New Zealand 1982) 

Bythitidae
Fish of Australia
Endemic marine fish of New Zealand
Fish described in 1896